Lokomotiv Stadium may refer to:

Belarus
 Lokomotiv Stadium (Minsk)

Bulgaria
 Lokomotiv Stadium (Gorna Oryahovitsa)
 Lokomotiv Stadium (Mezdra)
 Lokomotiv Stadium (Plovdiv)
 Lokomotiv Stadium (Ruse)
 Lokomotiv Stadium (Sofia)
 Lokomotiv Stadium (Stara Zagora)

Georgia
 Locomotive Stadium (Tbilisi)

Latvia
 Stadium Lokomotīve (Daugavpils)

Russia
 Lokomotiv Stadium (Chita)
 Lokomotiv Stadium (Moscow)
 Lokomotiv Stadium (Nizhny Novgorod)
 Lokomotiv Stadium (Perovo)
 Lokomotiv Stadium (Saratov)
 Lokomotiv Stadium (Smidovich), home ice of bandy club Urozhay

Ukraine
 Lokomotiv Stadium (Donetsk)

Uzbekistan
 Lokomotiv Stadium (Tashkent)